PA 63 can refer to
FEG PA-63
Pennsylvania Route 63